Adelakun Williamson Howells OBE was an Anglican Bishop in the second half of the 20th century.

He was born on 17 September 1905, educated at King's College, Lagos and ordained in 1928. He was a Tutor at the CMS Training College at Awka and then held incumbenciesat Enugu and Fourah Bay. In 1951 he became Provost of Lagos and in 1955 its third Bishop, a post he held until his death on 7 March 1963.

Notes

1905 births
King's College, Lagos alumni
Anglican provosts of the Church of Nigeria
Anglican bishops of Lagos
20th-century Anglican bishops in Nigeria
Officers of the Order of the British Empire
1963 deaths
Yoruba Christian clergy
Yoruba people